Geology is a peer-reviewed publication of the Geological Society of America (GSA). GSA says that it is the most widely read scientific journal in the field of earth science. It is published monthly, with each issue containing 20 or more articles. 

One of the goals of the journal is to provide a forum for shorter articles (four pages each) and less focus on purely academic research–type articles. According to the Journal Citation Reports, the journal had a 2020 impact factor of 5.399. The editorial board is very diverse. The journal is indexed in Scopus and SCImago.

See also
List of scientific journals
List of scientific journals in earth and atmospheric sciences

References

External links

Table of contents for current edition (with freely available abstracts)
Geology Home Page

Geological Society of America
Geology journals
Monthly journals
Publications established in 1973
English-language journals
Academic journals published by learned and professional societies of the United States